The 2010 CAA men's basketball tournament was held from March 5–8, 2010 at the Richmond Coliseum in Richmond, Virginia. The winner of the tournament was Old Dominion, who received an automatic bid to the 2010 NCAA Men's Division I Basketball Tournament. Old Dominion was unbeaten on home court this season, winning 15 of their 23 games at the Ted Constant Convocation Center. The final matchup between William & Mary and Old Dominion was their 53rd match-up in school history.

Television
The first round was not televised but was streamed live on CAASports.com. Quarterfinals and semifinals games were broadcast on various Comcast SportsNet networks. The championship game was broadcast on ESPN.

Tournament bracket

Honors

See also
 Colonial Athletic Association
 2009–10 Colonial Athletic Association men's basketball season

References

2010
2009–10 Colonial Athletic Association men's basketball season
CAA men's basketball tournament
CAA men's basketball tournament
Basketball competitions in Richmond, Virginia
College basketball tournaments in Virginia